Prachin Kamrupi Nritya Sangha is troupe for preservation and promotion of ancient Kamrupi dance forms. Since its formation it helped in renewing interest in forgotten dance forms of region.

Establishment
It was formed in April 1938, by Jibeswar Goswami and Suresh Chandra Goswami with a vision to conserve dying ancient dance forms of Kamrup region.

Role
Many ancient Kamrupi system of dancing, are revived by the Prachin Kamarupi Nritya Sangha, despite of hard time drawing public interest, raising funds and in keeping body and soul together.

See also
Kamrupi dance

References

Dance companies
Folk dance companies
Dance schools in India
Kamrupi culture